Mount Orville is a high peak of the Fairweather Range, the southernmost part of the Saint Elias Mountains. It is included in Glacier Bay National Park. The peak is the lower of a pair of peaks, Mounts Wilbur and Orville, named after the Wright Brothers.

Though not a particularly high peak in absolute terms, Mount Orville does stand quite high above local terrain, due to its proximity to the ocean: the summit is only 7.5 miles from tidewater at the head of Lituya Bay to the southwest.

Ascents
The first and only summit to date was achieved in 1995 by seasoned climbers Steven Carroll, Philip Kauffman, and Patrick Simmons. Despite the climbers' preparedness and experience, the climb was ill-fated. The three climbers were killed in an avalanche, on the descent, that was caused by unseasonable changes in weather conditions.

In April 2012 professional mountaineer Florian Hill and Will Wacker attempted Mount Orville several times but had to cut off the expedition due bad weather.

References

Mountains of Glacier Bay National Park and Preserve
Mountains of Alaska
Saint Elias Mountains
Landforms of Hoonah–Angoon Census Area, Alaska
Wright brothers
Mountains of Unorganized Borough, Alaska